Tall in the Trap is a 1962 Tom and Jerry animated short Western film, produced and released on September 14, 1962. It was the tenth of the thirteen cartoons in the series to be directed by Gene Deitch and produced by William L. Snyder in  Czechoslovakia. The short's plot parodies the popular CBS-TV western series that was airing at the time - Have Gun – Will Travel.

While the Deitch shorts were generally negatively-received by the Tom and Jerry fans, this particular short is often considered one of the most watchable ones.

Plot
In the stereotypical Wild Western town of Dry Gulp, Jerry - wanted for "cheese rustlin'" - steals a wedge of cheese from the general store. When the furious shopkeeper demands action, the sheriff, Mutt Dillin, hires the "Fastest Trap in the West". This turns out to be Tom, who arrives in town riding his spurs as if they were roller skates. He trips on a rock and crashes into the sheriff's office, and demonstrates his quick-draw abilities with a mousetrap, but gets his finger caught in it, yet he gets the job anyway.

Tom and Jerry meet for a showdown, but when Tom draws his guns, his belt and pants fall down making him humiliated, giving Jerry time to escape to a mouse-sized saloon. Tom reaches in to grab him, but Jerry puts a bag of flour - too big to fit through the hole - into his hand. As Tom tries to yank it out, Jerry opens up a trick entrance behind the saloon's sign and hits Tom over the head with a mallet. He then runs to a full-sized saloon, with Tom getting his head caught in its batwing doors before chasing him into the basement. Tom tries to shoot Jerry with a rifle, but Jerry tricks him into turning off the light switch at the top of the stairs so that he tumbles to the bottom. Jerry turns the lights back on and shoots Tom instead.

Another chase ensues, and after Jerry dives into a hole, Tom baits a trap and slides it in after him. Jerry grabs Tom's tail and puts it in the trap, sending him screaming back to town. Finally, Tom brings out a barrel of gunpowder, intending to blow up Jerry's hole. As he lights the fuse with a cigar and rolls the barrel away, Jerry bores a hole in the bottom and lights the powder trail that trickles out. In a panic, Tom dumps the barrel into a watering hole near the sheriff's office, dousing the powder trail - but the still-lit fuse sets off the powder and destroys the office. The singed sheriff starts shooting at Tom and runs him out of town, while Jerry steals the last wedge of cheese from the general store.

References

External links
 
 

1962 films
1962 animated films
1962 comedy films
1962 short films
1960s American animated films
1960s Western (genre) comedy films
1960s animated short films
American Western (genre) comedy films
Films directed by Gene Deitch
Metro-Goldwyn-Mayer animated short films
Metro-Goldwyn-Mayer short films
Rembrandt Films short films
Tom and Jerry short films
Western (genre) animated films
1960s English-language films